Ralstonia virus RSA1 is a virus of the family Myoviridae, genus Aresaunavirus.

As a member of the group I of the Baltimore classification, Ralstonia virus RSA1 is a dsDNA viruses. All the family Myoviridae members share a nonenveloped morphology consisting of a head and a tail separated by a neck. Its genome is linear. The propagation of the virions includes the attaching to a host cell (a bacterium, as Ralstonia virus RSA1 is a bacteriophage) and the injection of the double stranded DNA; the host transcribes and translates it to manufacture new particles. To replicate its genetic content requires host cell DNA polymerases and, hence, the process is highly dependent on the cell cycle.

Its genome is 38,760 base pairs long with 65.3% of GC content and 5′-extruding cohesive ends; contains 51 open reading frames.

References 

Myoviridae